A Treatise of Civil Power was published by John Milton in February 1659. The work argues over the definition and nature of heresy and free thought, and Milton tries to convince the new English Parliament to further his cause.

Background
A Treatise of Civil Power in Ecclesiastical Causes was published in February 1659 after Richard Cromwell established a new Parliament. Milton addresses the tract to Cromwell and Parliament because he was afraid of the various positions of the Interregnum government that promoted intolerance and limited the free speech of individuals (like Milton himself).

Tract
Although Milton knew that the word "heresy" was used as a pejorative, Milton believed that the term was properly defined as "only the choise or following of any opinion good or bad in religion or any other learning". Furthermore, he argues that a man is only moved "by the inward persuasive motions of his spirit".

The text is primarily concerned about the covenants formed between men and of agreements: "Let who so will interpret or determine, so it be according to true church; which is exercis'd on them only who have willingly joined themselves in that covnant of union".

Themes
Milton believed that an individual's conscience was more important than any external factors or forces. He uses heresy in a neutral manner in order to place the concept as an obligation of true Christians. The work, according to John Shawcross, is like other of his later works in that it contains "A fusion of submission and revolution". Thomas Corns believes the language of the text is subdued, comparatively speaking, and contains little of the powers of language found within Milton's earlier prose. Conversely, Kevin Hart wrote in First Things, "His powerful attack against the idea of a state church remains one of the most pungent pieces of prose in the language."

Notes

References
 Achinstein, Sharon. "Samson Agonistes" in A Companion to Milton. Ed. Thomas Corns. Oxford: Blackwell Publishing, 2003.
 Corns, Thomas. "Milton's prose" in The Cambridge Companion to Milton. Ed. Dennis Danielson. Cambridge: Cambridge University Press, 2003.
 Keeble, N. H. "Milton and Puritanism" in A Companion to Milton. Ed. Thomas Corns. Oxford: Blackwell Publishing, 2003.
 Milton, John. Complete Prose Works of John Milton Vol VII Ed. Don Wolfe. New Haven: Yale University Press, 1974.
 Mueller, Janel. "Milton on Heresy." in Milton and Heresy. Ed. Stephen Dobranski and John Rumrich. Cambridge: Cambridge University Press, 1998.
 Rumrich, John. "Radical Heterodoxy and Heresy" in A Companion to Milton. Ed. Thomas Corns. Oxford: Blackwell Publishing, 2003.
 Shawcross, John. John Milton: The Self and the World. Lexington: University Press of Kentucky, 1993.

External links
Online text from Dartmouth's Milton Reading Room

Works by John Milton
Treatises